Penicillium bussumense is a fungus species of the genus of Penicillium which is named after Bussum, in the Netherlands, where this species was first isolated.

See also
List of Penicillium species

References

bussumense
Fungi described in 2014